Priznachnoye is a rural locality (a selo) and the administrative center of Priznachenskoye Rural Settlement, Prokhorovsky District, Belgorod Oblast, Russia. The population was 615 as of 2010. There are 4 streets.

Geography 
Priznachnoye is located 9 km east of Prokhorovka (the district's administrative centre) by road. Vershina is the nearest rural locality.

References 

Rural localities in Prokhorovsky District